Thomas Hopper Alderson GC (15 September 1903 – 28 October 1965) was a British Air Raid Precautions (ARP) warden in Bridlington, and the first person to be directly awarded the George Cross (GC) shortly after its creation in 1940.

Born in Sunderland, Alderson was educated in West Hartlepool. After leaving school when 15, he joined the Merchant Navy as engineer but gave up seafaring in 1935. He worked in Bridlington at the time of World War II, where he was an Air Raid Warden. His GC was awarded to recognise his bravery in rescuing civilians trapped in bombed out buildings. After the war, he served in the Civil Defence Corps. He died of cancer in Driffield, aged 62.

Early life
Born on 15 September 1903 at Ashburne Stables, Sunderland, Alderson was the fifth of six children of domestic coachman Thomas Alderson (1864–1945) and Sarah Annie (1872–1942), née Hopper. He went first to his local village school and then to Elwick Road senior boys' school, West Hartlepool, becoming Head Boy. During World War I he was present at the bombardment of West Hartlepool by the German High Seas Fleet on 16 December 1914.

Career
After leaving school at 15, Alderson first worked as an office boy and then a draughtsman, before undertaking an engineering apprenticeship. He joined the Merchant Navy, becoming a first engineer. On 23 December 1932, he married Irene Doris (1899–1991), the daughter of agent Frederick R. A. Johnson, of West Hartlepool. Following the birth of his daughter in 1935 he became an engineer for West Hartlepool council. He also taught technical drawing at a night school for extra income. He moved to Bridlington in 1938 as works supervisor for the Bridlington Corporation. Local authorities were responsible for air raid precautions and trained their own workforces in rescue work. Alderson attended an anti-gas school at Easingwold, near York, and became an instructor in the subject.

World War II
Alderson worked as a part-time Air Raid Warden during World War II, leading a detachment of rescue and demolition parties in Bridlington. The coastal town was soon attacked by Luftwaffe bombers, and residential areas were hit. On three occasions in August 1940, Alderson led rescue teams and entered dangerous buildings to rescue trapped civilians. For his work, he was awarded the newly-instituted George Cross. It had been created to recognise acts of bravery in non-battle situations. The citation, published in The London Gazette, read:
  

He was the first person to receive the GC from King George VI, and in a radio broadcast at the time insisted that his award was for all the rescue parties in Bridlington.

Later life
In 1946, Alderson joined the East Riding of Yorkshire County Council workforce as an assistant highways surveyor. He then joined the new Civil Defence Corps, this time to protect the civilian population from nuclear warfare, rather than conventional bombs. On 28 October 1965 he died of lung cancer in Northfield Hospital at Driffield, Yorkshire. His George Cross is now on display at the Imperial War Museum alongside a medal from the RSPCA, awarded later in the war for rescuing two horses from a burning stable.

See also
List of George Cross recipients

Further reading
 Hissey, Terry – Come if ye Dare – The Civil Defence George Crosses, (2008), Civil Defence Assn

References

External links
 T.H. Alderson interview (1940) on The Blitz audiobook

British recipients of the George Cross
1903 births
1965 deaths
People from Sunderland
Deaths from lung cancer in England
Civil Defence Service personnel
Military personnel from County Durham